Antion (Ancient Greek: Ἀντίων), in Greek mythology, was the eldest son of Periphas and Astyaguia (daughter of Hypseus), who were distantly related. According to legend, he was the great-grandson of Apollo, his paternal grandfather being Lapithus, the son of Apollo and Stilbe and patriot of the Lapith people.

Antion married Perimele, and they became parents of the legendary demi-god Ixion. It is sometimes said that Ares was Ixion's father, although some sources have Phlegyas, Leonteus as the real father.

Notes

References 

Diodorus Siculus, The Library of History translated by Charles Henry Oldfather. Twelve volumes. Loeb Classical Library. Cambridge, Massachusetts: Harvard University Press; London: William Heinemann, Ltd. 1989. Vol. 3. Books 4.59–8. Online version at Bill Thayer's Web Site
Diodorus Siculus, Bibliotheca Historica. Vol 1-2. Immanel Bekker. Ludwig Dindorf. Friedrich Vogel. in aedibus B. G. Teubneri. Leipzig. 1888–1890. Greek text available at the Perseus Digital Library.
Gaius Julius Hyginus, Fabulae from The Myths of Hyginus translated and edited by Mary Grant. University of Kansas Publications in Humanistic Studies. Online version at the Topos Text Project.
Strabo, The Geography of Strabo. Edition by H.L. Jones. Cambridge, Mass.: Harvard University Press; London: William Heinemann, Ltd. 1924. Online version at the Perseus Digital Library.
Strabo, Geographica edited by A. Meineke. Leipzig: Teubner. 1877. Greek text available at the Perseus Digital Library.

Lapiths in Greek mythology